Tamaki College is co-educational Secondary School in Glen Innes, Auckland, New Zealand.

Originally constructed on two sites, it was planned to create a separate boys and girls colleges when the roll reached 1400. The separate sites in Glen Innes saw the establishment of the 'girls' school in 1955 with the last site in 1957.

This did not occur and the school remained on two sites until 1987.

In 2003 the 'girls' school was closed after a fire burned much of the building.

Tamaki College serves the communities of Glen Innes and Panmure; it celebrated its Diamond Jubilee in 2017.

Since 1998 there has been an extensive redevelopment within the school including the recreation centre, technological block and library.

Tamaki College is part of the "Trades Academies" initiative of the New Zealand Ministry of Education.

Tamaki College is part of the "Services Academies" initiative of the New Zealand Ministry of Education.

Tamaki College is part of an innovation service in partnership with Pacific Futures Limited. The Tereora Academy helps pathway students through Science onto Health and Science tertiary pathways.

Enrolment 
Tamaki College is a member of the International Students Code.

At a 2017 Education Review Office review, Tamaki College had 631 students included 2 international students. At the same review the following data shows the ethnic make up of the school.

Houses 
 
Each of the houses has a Male and Female House Captain and Deputy House Captains.

Traditions 
The heart of the school life is centred around the schools Marae complex, Te Poho O Tamaki. All students and staff starting their journey at Tamaki College goes through the tradition of being welcomed into the school through powhiri.

Principals

Notable alumni

Academia 

Alvina Pau’uvale - is a researcher and scientist for the University of Auckland

Sport 

Graeme Crossmen - was a professional rugby union player in New Zealand touring with the All Blacks to South Africa in 1976.  
George Moala - is a professional rugby union player in New Zealand, representing Auckland and The Blues.
Doris Taufateau - is a female rugby union player for New Zealand and Auckland and is a current staff member of the school. 
Siosiua Halanukonuka - is a professional Tongan rugby union player. He plays in the prop position for the France side Perpignan. Halanukonuka also represents Tonga at international level 
Maiakawanakaulani Roos - is a female rugby union player for New Zealand and Auckland.

Former Staff 

Richie Harris - Director of rugby and head coach of the Northland ITM Cup.
David Hodge - Former Principal of Tamaki College and Rangitoto College, Head of Saint Kentigerns

References

External links
 

Secondary schools in Auckland
Educational institutions established in 1955
1955 establishments in New Zealand